Terry Ryan (November 26, 1922 – May 5, 2001) was an American screenwriter.

Awards and honors
Ryan won Emmy Awards for his work on The Phil Silvers Show in 1955 and 1957.

References

External links

1922 births
2001 deaths
American television producers
Emmy Award winners
20th-century American screenwriters